The Best of The Guess Who is the fourth compilation album by the Canadian group The Guess Who. It was originally released by RCA Records in April 1971 and contains recordings made between 1968 and 1970. The album reached number 12 on the Billboard top LPs chart in the United States.

A follow up, The Best of The Guess Who Volume II, was released in 1973.

Release history

Some of the songs on this album are edited single versions. For example, the single version of "American Woman", which is missing the acoustic introduction, is used. Conversely, while the single version of "Hang On to Your Life" did not include the spoken excerpt from Psalm 22 at the end, the original album version with the spoken outro was used for this compilation.

In addition to the usual 2-channel stereo version, the album was also released by RCA in a 4-channel quadraphonic version on 8-track tape and reel-to-reel.

The first CD issue in 1988 by RCA replaced the single version of "American Woman" with the album version. A reissue by Legacy Recordings in 2006 had the single version restored and added three bonus tracks.

In 2014, the album was released in the Super Audio CD format by Audio Fidelity. This version contains the complete stereo and quadraphonic versions on one disc. The stereo version includes the full album version of "American Woman", but the quad version has the edited recording. Both the stereo and quad versions of "Hang On to Your Life" include the Psalm 22 ending.

Reception
Gary Hill of AllMusic says "It is sometimes hard to believe that the same group that brought the world the jazzy 'Undun' and the CS&N-ish hippie anthem 'Share the Land' is also responsible for the rocking 'No Time.' This 11-track collection paints a very entertaining picture of a mutli-talented band and is a perfect introduction for the casual fan."

Track listing

The original 1990 CD issue contains a misprint of the running time for "No Sugar Tonight/New Mother Nature" as 7:51.

Personnel
The Guess Who  
on tracks 1-6
Burton Cummings – lead vocals, rhythm guitar, keyboards, flute, harmonica
Randy Bachman – lead and rhythm guitar, backing vocals
Jim Kale – bass, backing vocals
Garry Peterson – drums, backing vocals
on tracks 7-11 + bonus tracks
Burton Cummings - lead vocals, keyboards
Kurt Winter - lead guitar, backing vocals
Greg Leskiw - rhythm guitar, backing vocals
Jim Kale - bass, backing vocals
Garry Peterson - drums, backing vocals

Additional personnel
Arranger: The Guess Who (Tracks 4-11)
Engineer: David Greene and Elliot Scheiner (Tracks 1-3), Randy Kling (Tracks 4-6), Brian Christian (Tracks 4-5)
Producer: Jack Richardson

References

1971 compilation albums
The Guess Who albums
RCA Victor compilation albums